The 2021–22 All-Ireland Senior Club Hurling Championship was the 51st staging of the All-Ireland Senior Club Hurling Championship, the Gaelic Athletic Association's premier inter-county club hurling tournament. It was the first club championship to be completed in two years as the 2020–21 Championship was cancelled due to the COVID-19 pandemic. The championship began on 27 November 2021 and ended on 12 February 2022.

Ballyhale Shamrocks of Kilkenny were the defending champions.

The All-Ireland final was played on 12 February 2022 at Croke Park in Dublin, between Ballygunner of Waterford and Ballyhale Shamrocks of Kilkenny, in what was their first ever meeting in a final. Ballygunner won the match by 2-17 to 1-19 to claim their first ever All-Ireland title.

Ballyhale's T. J. Reid was the championship's top scorer with 2-31.

Competition format

County Championships

The top hurling teams in Ireland's counties compete in their senior club championship. Each county decides the format for determining their county champions – it can be knockout, double-elimination, league, etc or a combination.

Only single club teams are allowed to enter the All-Ireland Club championship. If a team which is an amalgamation of two or more clubs, a divisional team or a university team wins a county's championship, a single club team will represent that county in the provincial championship as determined by that county's championship rules. Normally it is the club team that exited the county championship at the highest stage.

Provincial Championships

Leinster, Munster and Ulster organise a provincial championship for their participating county champions. Connacht discontinued their senior club championship after 2007 but they do organise intermediate and junior championships. The Galway champions represent Connacht in the All-Ireland senior club semi-finals as Galway club hurling is at higher level than the hurling in the other four Connacht counties.

Some Leinster, Munster and Ulster counties enter their senior champions in the All-Ireland intermediate club championship (tier 2) as it is recognised that club hurling is weak in those counties.

All matches are knock-out. Two ten minute periods of extra time are played each way if it's a draw at the end of normal time in all matches including the final. If the score is still level after extra time the match is replayed.

All-Ireland

The Leinster, Munster and Ulster champions and the Galway county champions compete in two semi-finals. The All-Ireland final takes place on 13 February 2022 - traditionally the All-Ireland final was played on St. Patrick's Day, the 17th of March but this has been discontinued.

All matches are knock-out. Two ten minute periods of extra time are played each way if it's a draw at the end of normal time in the semi-finals or final. If the score is still level after extra time the match is replayed.

Team Summaries

Provincial championships

Leinster Senior Club Hurling Championship

Quarter-finals

Semi-finals

Final

Munster Senior Club Hurling Championship

Quarter-final

Semi-finals

Final

Ulster Senior Club Hurling Championship

Semi-final

Final

All-Ireland Senior Club Hurling Championship

Semi-finals

Final

Championship statistics

Top scorers

Overall

In a single game

Miscellaneous

 Clough/Ballacolla qualified for the Leinster semi-finals and final for the first time in their history.
 Ballygunner became the first team from Waterford to win the All-Ireland title.

References

2021 in hurling
2022 in hurling
All-Ireland Senior Club Hurling Championship